Pace del Mela (Sicilian: Paci) is a comune (municipality) in the Province of Messina in the Italian region Sicily, located about  east of Palermo and about  west of Messina.

Pace del Mela borders the following municipalities: Condrò, Gualtieri Sicaminò, San Filippo del Mela, San Pier Niceto, Santa Lucia del Mela.

Twin towns
 Trikala, Greece
 Limoges, France
 Olbia, Italy

People
 Massimo Mollica (1929–2013)

References

Cities and towns in Sicily